Staadts is a ghost town, in the town of Eau Pleine, Marathon County, Wisconsin, United States. The town was marked on USGS maps as late as 1953.

References 

Geography of Marathon County, Wisconsin
Ghost towns in Wisconsin